Lingguandian Town is a town located in the southern part of the Shaodong County, Hunan Province. Its name in Chinese means Temple of Spiritual Officer in Daoism. It is located in a hilly area surrounded by mountains, with a flat middle and shaped like a basin. Lingguandian Town governs 41 villages and one neighborhood committee. The town has complete infrastructure, rich tourism resources and special resources, and Lingguan Temple has unique fish farming resources. The economy is developing well.

History 
In 1950, it was the tenth district of Shaoyang County. In 1961, Maohedian Township was established. In 1995, it was renamed Linguandian Township. In 1996, it was built. On December 31, 2015, the original Shizhuqiao Township and the original Lingguandian Town merged into a new Lingguandian Town.

Location 
Lingguandian Town is situated at the junction of Xiangyang, Shaoyang and Hengyang "Sanyang", which is a strategically importantant location. It borders Shetian Bridge in the east, Jidong and Xiangyang in the west, and faces the Fort Front in the south. It is the only entrance from Hunan to Guangxi. Shao Gui Highway crosses the territory. Jurisdiction over 41 villages and one neighborhood committee.

Natural resources 
Lingguandian Town is rich in products. The lead-zinc deposits and fluorite deposits in the Dayunshan Gold Mine, Ma'anshan and Xiaotoutou are not only rich in reserves, but also have high mining rates. The Mine 717 at the foot of Dayun Mountain was once a key enterprise in the central and provincial provinces. The agriculture of Lingguandian Town is mainly planted with double-season rice. In recent years, the cultivation of oil tea, grapes and medicinal materials has flourished. Among them, the output of grapes is the largest, and the variety is high and the quality is excellent. Famous for its products, the products are sold both inside and outside the province. Tea oil is another special product of Lingguan Temple. More than 20 villages such as Shengwang and Qiaozhuangchong are rich in tea fruit, processed tea oil, no oil residue, clear and pure, and it is a true pure natural vegetable oil.

Infrastructure 
In 2014, with the support of the county party committee and county government, the county's only central enterprise, Zhongxiang Wind Power, was introduced. In 2015, it was connected to the grid for power generation with a total investment of 450 million yuan and an annual power generation capacity of 100 million kWh.

References 

Towns of Hunan
Divisions of Shaodong